Edgar Papu or Edgard I. Pappu (Bucharest, 13/26 September 1908 – 30 March 1993) was a Romanian scholar of literature and a professor. He is notable for the coining of the term protochronism (Romanian protochronismul) in 1974, and for assisting development of this nationalist-literary-historical concept during the Ceaucescu regime.

References

Romanian classical scholars
1908 births
1993 deaths
Writers from Bucharest
Members of the Romanian Academy elected posthumously